The 2013 Atlantic Coast Conference baseball tournament was held from May 22 through 26 at Durham Bulls Athletic Park in Durham, North Carolina.  The annual tournament determines the conference champion of the Division I Atlantic Coast Conference for college baseball. Top seeded North Carolina won the tournament and received the league's automatic bid to the 2013 NCAA Division I baseball tournament. It was North Carolina's sixth ACC Tournament win. This was the last of 19 athletic championship events held by the conference in the 2012–13 academic year.  This was the sixth time the ACC hosted its baseball championship in Durham.

Prior to this year, the tournament has been held every year but one since 1973, with Clemson winning nine championships, most of any team. Georgia Tech, last year's winner, has claimed eight tournament wins.  Charter league members Duke and Maryland, along with recent entrants Virginia Tech and Boston College have never won the event.

Format and seeding
The winner of each six team division and the top six other teams based on conference winning percentage, regardless of division, from the conference's regular season were seeded one through eight.  Seeds one and two were awarded to the two division winners.  The tournament used the same format adopted in the 2007 event, with the teams divided into two pools of four.  Each pool will play a round-robin set of games over the first four days of the event.  The teams with the best record in each pool then meet in a single championship game on Sunday, May 26.  This was the final season of this format, as the tournament will expand to ten teams beginning in 2014.

Schedule and results

Notes
† – Denotes extra innings
‡ – Denotes game shortened due to mercy rule

Results
All times shown are US EDT.

Division A

Division B

Championship final

All-Tournament Team
The following players were named to the All-Tournament Team.

Most Valuable Player
Cody Stubbs was named Tournament Most Valuable Player.  Stubbs was a first baseman for North Carolina.

References

Tournament
Atlantic Coast Conference baseball tournament
Atlantic Coast Conference baseball tournament
Atlantic Coast Conference baseball tournament
Baseball competitions in Durham, North Carolina
College baseball tournaments in North Carolina